Kahi To Milenge is an Indian television series that premiered on Sahara TV now known as Sahara One on 3 November 2001.

Plot
The story is based on the story of four adopted siblings who are separated by fate and destined to come together at the same college unaware of their blood relationship.

Cast
 Karishma Tanna as Tanisha
 Geetanjali Tikekar as Sanjana
 Aashish Kaul
 Ujjwal Rana
 Puneet Vashisht 
 Shabbir Ahluwalia as Shashank
 Anupam Bhattacharya 
 Amita Nangia
 Usha Bachani
 Dolly Bindra
 Gargi Patel

References

External links
 
 

Balaji Telefilms television series
Sahara One original programming
Indian drama television series
2002 Indian television series debuts
2003 Indian television series endings